Agnes Winifred McLaughlin (1882-1964) was the first woman admitted to practice law in New Hampshire.

Early life and work 
McLaughlin was born in Coös County, New Hampshire, on April 15, 1882, and she was raised in Lancaster, New Hampshire. McLaughlin graduated from Lancaster Academy in 1901, where she distinguished herself in debate and public speaking. As a result, her classmates predicted that she would become a lawyer. She then attended Burdett Business College in Boston for secretarial training. Afterward, she worked for two different attorneys in Coös County, including taking depositions in French and English. Her career moved to the Berlin Municipal Court, where was served as official court stenographer for several years. She then became secretary to a prominent trial lawyer, and through him made connections with nearly all bar members in northern New Hampshire.

Becoming an attorney 
McLaughlin petitioned the New Hampshire Supreme Court "that she may be allowed to take an examination with a view to [bar] admission". Her petition states she studied law under two different attorneys from 1911 until 1917 and at the University of Maine Law School. She became the first woman admitted to practice law in New Hampshire on June 30, 1917.

Career and death 
Attorney McLaughlin was on a business trip in New York during World War I when she was offered a position at a law firm on Broadway. She later worked in a new estate planning division at the Equitable Life Insurance Company. She stayed there for 25 years until she retired. She retired to New Hampshire, first to a family farm in Shelburne, and, then, to Gorham, where she resided until her death in a hospital in Berlin, New Hampshire on October 29, 1964.

Legacy 
The New Hampshire Women's Bar Association, in partnership with the University of New Hampshire Franklin Pierce School of Law, has created a scholarship given to a second year law student each year that is named in McLaughlin's honor.

See also 
 List of first women lawyers and judges in New Hampshire

References

External links 
Page about McLaughlin on the New Hampshire Women's Bar Association website
New Hampshire Women's Bar Association Wikipedia Project

New Hampshire lawyers
1882 births
1964 deaths
20th-century American women lawyers
20th-century American lawyers